Clare Stancliffe is a historian and medievalist. She teaches Ecclesiastical History in the Departments of History and of Theology & Religion at Durham University. She is known for developing the idea of the "colors of martyrdom" in early Irish Christianity.

Publications
Her publications include: 
 "Red, White and Blue Martyrdom", in Ireland in Early Mediaeval Europe: Studies in memory of Kathleen Hughes (Cambridge University Press, 1982), 
 "Cuthbert and the Polarity between Pastor and Solitary", in Gerald Bonner, David Rollason, Clare Stancliffe (eds), St Cuthbert, His Cult and His Community to AD 1200 (Woodbridge: Boydell Press, 1989), pp. 21–44
 "Oswald: Most Holy and Most Victorious King of the Northumbrians", in Clare Stancliffe & Eric Cambridge (eds) Oswald: Northumbrian King to European Saint (Stamford: Paul Watkins, 1995)
 "Where Was Oswald Killed?", in C. Stancliffe and E. Cambridge (eds), Oswald: Northumbrian King to European Saint (1995, 1996)
 "St Martin and his hagiographer: History and miracle in Sulpicius Severus" (Oxford: Clarendon Press, 1983)
 Bede, Wilfrid, and the Irish, Jarrow Lecture 46 (Jarrow: St Paul's Church, 2003)
 "Patrick (fl. 5th cent.), patron saint of Ireland", Oxford Dictionary of National Biography (2004)
 The Miracle Stories in Seventh-century Irish Saints' Lives (1992)

References 

Living people
British medievalists
Women medievalists
British historians
British women historians
Academics of Durham University
Year of birth missing (living people)